Year 1291 (MCCXCI) was a common year starting on Monday (link will display the full calendar) of the Julian calendar.

Events 
 By place 

 Europe 
 August 1 – Federal Charter of 1291: The "three forest cantons" (Waldstätte) of Switzerland (Schwyz, Uri and Unterwalden) form a defensive alliance to protect themselves from the House of Habsburg, this is a starting point for growth of the Old Swiss Confederacy. This year is also the traditional date of the Rütlischwur, the swearing of an oath by the three cantonal representatives at Rütli meadow.
 August 6 – A combined Genoese-Sevillian fleet led by Admiral Benedetto Zaccaria wins a victory over 27 Marinid galleys at Alcácer Seguir –12 galleys are taken and the rest put to flight. The following day, Benedetto drags the captured vessels along the coast in view of Abu Yaqub Yusuf an-Nasr, Marinid ruler of Morocco, who, "defeated and dishonored", withdraws his fleet to Fez. 
 Late September – Abu Yaqub Yusuf an-Nasr crosses the Strait of Gibraltar from Alcácer Seguir to Tarifa. During the next three months, Marinid forces besiege Vejer de la Frontera, and carry out daily raids around Ferez. In the meantime, other Marinid raiding parties devastate the countryside as far north as Alcalá del Río, near Seville. 
 November–December – The kings Sancho IV (the Brave) and  James II (the Just) agree to join the war against the Marinids and conclude a treaty of friendship. Muhammad II, Nasrid ruler of Granada, gives his support to Sancho to take Tarifa from the Marinids. In the agreement, Castile and Aragon will respect their own boundaries.
 Klenová Castle is constructed in southern Bohemia near the town of Klatovy (modern Czech Republic) as part of a frontier defense system.
 Venetian glass manufacture is concentrated on the island of Murano (located in the Venetian Lagoon), to prevent fires in Venice itself.
 King Andrew III (the Venetian) gives royal town privileges to Bratislava, modern-day capital of Slovakia.

 England 
 Spring – Several nobles unsuccessful claimed the Scottish throne (a process known as the Great Cause), including John Balliol, Robert V (de Bruse), John Hastings, and William de Vesci. Fearing civil war, the Guardians of Scotland ask King Edward I (Longshanks) to arbitrate. Before agreeing, he obtains concessions to revive English overlordship over the Scots.
 May 10 – Edward I (Longshanks) meets the claimants for the Scottish crown at Norham Castle and informs them that he will judge the various claims to the throne. But they must acknowledge him as overlord of Scotland and, to ensure peace, surrender the Royal Castles of the kingdom into his keeping.
 June 13 – Guardians and the Scottish nobles recognize Edward I (Longshanks) as overlord of Scotland. They agree that the kingdom will be handed over to Edward until a rightful heir has been found.

 Levant 
 May 18 – Siege of Acre: Mamluk forces under Sultan Al-Ashraf Khalil capture Acre after a six-week siege. The Mamluks take the outer wall of the city after fierce fighting. The Military Orders drive them back temporarily, but three days later the inner wall is breached. King Henry II escapes, but the bulk of the defenders and most of the citizens perish in the fighting or are sold into slavery. The surviving knights fall back to the fortified towers and resist for ten days until the Mamluks breakthrough on May 28. The fall of Acre signals the end of the Crusader Kingdom of Jerusalem. No effective Crusade is raised to recapture the Holy Land afterward.
 June – Al-Ashraf Khalil enters Damascus in triumph with Crusaders chained at their feet and the captured Crusader standards – which are carried upside-down as a sign of their defeat. Following the capture of Acre, Khalil and his Mamluk generals proceed to wrest control of the remaining Crusader-held fortresses along the Syrian coast. Within weeks, the Mamluks conquer Tyre, Sidon, Beirut, Haifa and Tartus.
 July – Thibaud Gaudin arrives with the surviving knights, with the treasure of the Order, in Sidon. There, he is elected as Grand Master of the Knights Templar, to succeed William of Beaujeu (who is deadly wounded during the siege of Acre). Shortly after, Mamluk forces attack Sidon and Gaudin (who has not had enough knights to defend) evacuates the city and moves to the Castle of the Sea on July 14.
 August – Mamluk forces conquer the last Crusader outpost in Syria, the Templar fortress of Atlit south of Acre on August 14. All that now is left to the Knights Templar is the island fortress of Ruad. Al-Ashraf Khalil returns to Cairo in triumph as the "victor in the long struggle against the Crusader states".

 Asia 
 In Japan the temple of Nanzen-ji at Kyoto is established by Emperor Kameyama. This temple becomes one of the most important religious schools within the Rinzai sect of Zen Buddhism and includes multiple sub-temples. 
 Guo Shoujing, Chinese engineer and astronomer, constructs the artificial Kunming Lake, which is developed into a reservoir with summer gardens for Khanbaliq (or Dadu of Yuan), Mongol capital of Emperor Kublai Khan.

 By topic 

 Exploration 
 Spring – The brothers Vandino and Ugolino Vivaldi, Italian explorers and merchants from Genoa, embark with two galleys intending to reach India and establish a trade route to Italy. They sail along the coast of present-day Morocco after passing through the Strait of Gibraltar. They may have followed the African coast as far as Cape Non before being lost at sea.

 Markets 
 Four towns of the County of Holland (Dordrecht, Haarlem, Leiden and Alkmaar) and two of the County of Zeeland (Middelburg and Zierikzee) agree collectively to secure a loan by their sovereign, Count Floris V. This gives important securities to the lenders, and allows Floris to access the same low interest rates as the cities’ governments.

 Religion 
 Pope Nicholas IV confirms the independence of San Marino by papal bull.

Births 
 February 8 – Afonso IV (the Brave), king of Portugal (d. 1357)
 March 9 – Cangrande I della Scala, Italian nobleman (d. 1329)
 May 10 – Gilbert de Clare, English nobleman and knight (d. 1314)
 August 12 – Ichijō Uchitsune, Japanese nobleman (kugyō) (d. 1325)
 September 23 – Bolesław III, Polish nobleman and knight (d. 1352)
 October 31 – Philippe de Vitry, French musician and poet (d. 1361)
 December 15 – Aymon (the Peaceful), Savoyan nobleman (d. 1343)
 December 20 – Margareta Ebner, German nun and mystic (d. 1351)
 Hugh de Audley, English nobleman, knight and diplomat (d. 1347)
 Luis de la Cerda, French nobleman, prince and admiral (d. 1348)
 Luitgard of Wittichen, German nun, abbess and mystic (d. 1348)
 Marie of Artois, French noblewoman (House of Artois) (d. 1365)
 Shah Kamal Quhafah, Arab philanthropist and mystic (d. 1385)
 Tōin Kinkata, Japanese official, historian and writer (d. 1360)

Deaths 
 March 5 – Sa'ad al-Dawla, Persian physician and vizier (b. 1240)
 March 10 – Arghun Khan, Mongol ruler of the Ilkhanate (b. 1258)
 March 16 – Alauddin Sabir Kaliyari, Indian Sufi preacher (b. 1196)
 May 11 – Thomas Ingoldsthorpe, English archdeacon and bishop
 May 18 – Matthew of Clermont, French nobleman and Marshal
 May 25 – Benedict, Swedish nobleman, prince and knight (b. 1254)
 June 5 – John I, German nobleman (House of Ascania) (b. 1260)
 June 18 – Alfonso III (or II) (the Liberal), king of Aragon (b. 1265)
 June 25 – Eleanor of Provence, queen consort of England (b. 1223)
 June 27 – Tanhum of Jerusalem, Outremer lexicographer (b. 1220)
 July 12 – Herman VII (the Rouser), German nobleman (b. 1266)
 July 15 – Rudolf I, king of Germany (House of Habsburg) (b. 1218)
 August 16 – Frederick Tuta, German nobleman and regent (b. 1269)
 October 8 – Henry I, German nobleman, prince and knight (b. 1245)
 December 11 – Francesco Lippi, Italian monk and hermit (b. 1211)
 Alfonso of Castile, Spanish nobleman and prince (infante) (b. 1286)
 Badr al-Din Solamish, Mamluk ruler of Egypt and Syria (b. 1272)
 Guy de Montfort, English nobleman and Vicar-General (b. 1244)
 Hong Dagu (or Jun-gi), Korean ruler and military leader (b. 1244) 
 Muzaffar al-Din Hajjaj, Qutlughkhanid prince and co-ruler (b. 1247)
 Niall Culanach O'Neill (or Culanagh), king of Tír Eoghain (b. 1231)
 Nuño González II, Spanish nobleman and knight (House of Lara) 
 Philip Marmion, Norman King's Champion, High Sheriff and knight
 William de Braose, Norman nobleman (House of Braose) (b. 1224) 
 William of Beaujeu, French nobleman and Grand Master (b. 1230)

References